GUV may refer to:
 General Utility Van, a British rail vehicle
 Governor
 Guruvayur railway station, in Kerala, India